Kappa Cancri, Latinized from κ Cancri, is a blue-white hued binary star system in the zodiac constellation of Cancer. It is faintly visible to the naked eye with an apparent visual magnitude of +5.23. The magnitude difference between the two stars is about 2.6. Based upon an annual parallax shift of 5.3209 mas as seen from the Earth, the system is located roughly 610 light-years from the Sun.

This is a single-lined spectroscopic binary star system with an orbital period of 6.39 days and an eccentricity of 0.13. The primary, component A, has a stellar classification of B8 IIIp, suggesting it is a B-type giant star. It a mercury-manganese star, a type of chemically peculiar star showing large overabundances of those two elements in the outer atmosphere. It is classified as an Alpha2 Canum Venaticorum type variable star and its brightness varies from magnitude +5.22 to +5.27 with a period of five days.

References

B-type giants
Alpha2 Canum Venaticorum variables
Mercury-manganese stars
Spectroscopic binaries
Cancri, Kappa
Cancer (constellation)
Durchmusterung objects
078316
Cancri, 76
044798
3623